Kevin Saucedo Mosquera (born 28 February 2000) is a Colombian professional footballer who plays as a defender for USL Championship side Real Monarchs SLC.

Club career
Saucdeo was part of the academy before joining USL Championship side Real Monarchs SLC on 16 December 2020 ahead of their 2021 season. He debuted for Salt Lake on 26 May 2021, starting in a 2–0 loss to Austin Bold.

References

2000 births
Association football defenders
Colombia youth international footballers
Colombian expatriate footballers
Colombian footballers
Expatriate soccer players in the United States
Living people
Millonarios F.C. players
People from Quibdó
Real Monarchs players
USL Championship players
Colombian expatriate sportspeople in the United States
Sportspeople from Chocó Department